Battle of Stralsund may refer to any of the following battles and/or sieges:

Siege of Stralsund (1628), a battle in the Thirty Years' War
Siege of Stralsund (1678), a siege in the Scanian War
Siege of Stralsund (1711–1715), a siege in the Great Northern War
Blockade of Stralsund, a 1757-58 armed investment of Stralsund by Prussian forces during the Seven Years' War
Siege of Stralsund (1807), a battle during the Napoleonic Wars
Battle of Stralsund (1809), a battle during the Napoleonic Wars